Since 1990, there have been a small number of places in Namibia which have been renamed, mainly for political, cultural, or linguistic reasons. Some names have been changed to remove colonial or apartheid references, often reverting to their original native language names. Other names (such as street names in Windhoek) have been renamed after foreign leaders or famous Namibians. Overall, Namibia has had fewer renamed places than neighbouring South Africa and Zimbabwe.

German period

Most place names in German South West Africa continued to bear German spellings of the local names, as well as German translations of some local phrases.
The few exceptions to the rule included places founded by the Rhenish Missionary Society, generally biblical names, as well as
Hornkranz (Hoornkrans)
Sandfontein
Stolzenfels
Waterberg (Omuverumue)

Regions and constituencies 
 Caprivi Region → Zambezi Region (2013)
 Okavango Region → Kavango Region (1998)
 Lüderitz Constituency → ǃNamiǂNûs Constituency (2013)

Settlements 
 ǀAixa-aibes → Warmbad (1760)
 Kalkfontein → Karasburg (1939)
 Klipfontein (ǀUiǂgandes) → Bethanie (1815)
 Schuckmannsburg → Luhonono (2013)
 Welwitschia → Khorixas (1989)

Streets

Swakopmund 
Status: 2002

Windhoek 
Status: 2021

The sources of the previous renaming documents are outdated or no longer available and are being reprocessed.

Airports 
 J. G. Strydom International Airport → Hosea Kutako International Airport (1990)

Other 
 Windhoek: Zoo Park → Verwoerd Park → Zoo Park (2004)

See also 
 List of placename renaming in South Africa
 List of placename renaming in Zimbabwe

References 

Politics of Namibia
Namibia
Namibia